Eugene Barton (April 27, 1880 – July 3, 1922), nicknamed "Cherry", was an American Negro league outfielder between 1906 and 1910.

A native of Normal, Illinois, Barton was the younger brother of fellow Negro leaguer Sherman Barton. He joined his brother on the Leland Giants in 1906, then went on to play three seasons with the Minneapolis Keystones from 1908 to 1910. Barton died in Chicago, Illinois in 1922 at age 42.

References

External links
 and Seamheads

1880 births
1922 deaths
Leland Giants players
Minneapolis Keystones players
Baseball outfielders
Baseball players from Illinois
People from Normal, Illinois
20th-century African-American people